Taro Tan (born 13 August 1967) is a Canadian judoka. He competed in the men's half-lightweight event at the 1996 Summer Olympics.

References

1967 births
Living people
Canadian male judoka
Olympic judoka of Canada
Judoka at the 1996 Summer Olympics
Sportspeople from Montreal
Pan American Games medalists in judo
Pan American Games bronze medalists for Canada
Judoka at the 1995 Pan American Games
Medalists at the 1995 Pan American Games
20th-century Canadian people
21st-century Canadian people